Kotki or Kotki Bala is a town and union council of Hangu District in Khyber Pakhtunkhwa province of Pakistan. It is located at 33°28'0N 71°1'0E and has an altitude of 1011 metres (3320 feet).

References

Union councils of Hangu District
Populated places in Hangu District, Pakistan